Maria Leijerstam is a British polar adventurer. In 2013 she became the first person to cycle to the South Pole from the edge of the continent. Leijerstam's cycle was a three wheeled design, and she reached the pole faster than any previous skiing expedition.

Early life 
In June 1978, Leijerstam was born in Aberdare, Wales, United Kingdom, to Adrianne and Anders Leijerstam.

Education 
Leijerstam studied mathematics at Plymouth University.

Career 
Leijerstam was a consultant for Siemens, BAE Systems and Ford. She worked in Germany and Sweden for several years, before moving back to Wales where she now lives with her partner, Wayne Edy, founder of the running shoe manufacturer Inov-8.

Sports 

During her time at Plymouth University, Leijerstam used the sports facilities of the University Officers Training Corps, a youth organisation of the British Army, and became an enthusiastic outdoor athlete. Over the years, she learned outdoor, water and winter sports, including long-distance running (single and double marathon, ultramarathon) mountaineering, hiking and trekking, skiing, cycling, multisport, canoeing, sailing and rally racing.

Leijerstam has taken part in competitions all over the world. Her successes include Canoe Marathon Devizes to Westminster International (2014), multi-sport adventure race Patagonian Expedition Race (2013), Surf Ski Race Rhoose Ski Race (2012), Triathlon Ironman UK (2010), Rally Car Racing Land Rover G4 Challenge (2009), Multisport Race Three Peaks Yacht Race (2008) and Turas World Adventure Race (2008).

In 2007, Leijerstam became the first Welsh woman to complete in the Marathon des Sables where she ran six marathons in seven days, battling extreme high temperatures. In 2012, she became the first woman to complete the Siberian Black Ice Race, cycling across Lake Baikal, the longest and deepest frozen freshwater lake in the world.

White Ice Cycle 

At the end of 2013, Leijerstam gained a Guinness World Record in an expedition known as the White Ice Cycle, becoming the first person in the world to reach the South Pole by cycling. She also holds the record for the fastest trip from the edge of the Antarctic continent to the South Pole using purely muscle strength.

Leijerstam completed the almost- route from the Ross Ice Shelf on the edge of the Antarctic to the South Pole in just over 10 days. Whilst riding, she fought against extreme cold, strong winds and snow drifts on the track.

A custom-built recumbent trike called the Polar Cycle, made by Inspired Cycle Engineering (ICE), helped Leijerstam secure her record. Her rivals (Juan Menéndez Granados and Daniel Burton) rode standard upright bikes and took almost 4 weeks longer than Leijerstam to reach the summit.

In April 2016, Leijerstam ran a marathon at the floating airbase  from the North Pole before cycling the rest of the way.

Burn Series 
Leijerstam runs a multi-sport company, Burn Series. The adventure racing events held across South Wales are both a challenge and for fun, with the Mini Burn, a shorter and more diverse ‘triathlon’, aimed towards families. The events consist of running, mountain biking, kayaking and orienteering. The Mini Burn is the only adventure race in the UK where both parents and children can compete together.

See also 
 Roald Amundsen
 List of Antarctic cycling expeditions

References

External links 
 Maria Leijerstam at BBC.com
 Maria Leijerstam at guinnessworldrecords.com

Living people
Welsh polar explorers
People from Aberdare
1978 births
Alumni of the University of Plymouth